The men's 1500 metres T38 event at the 2020 Summer Paralympics in Tokyo took place on 4 September 2021.

Records
Prior to the competition, the existing records were as follows:

Results
The final took place on 4 September 2021, at 19:15:

References

Men's 1500 metres T38
2021 in men's athletics